Beyond Betrayal is a 1994 American made-for-television action drama thriller film directed by Carl Schenkel and starring Susan Dey and Richard Dean Anderson.

Plot
Joanna runs away from her abusive cop husband and meets Sam, who is separated from his obsessive wife.

Cast
 Susan Dey .... Joanna / Emma Doyle
 Richard Dean Anderson .... Bradley Matthews
 Annie Corley .... Iris McKay
 James Tolkan .... Joe Maloney
 Michael O'Neill .... Ray Pasquerello
 Dennis Boutsikaris .... Sam
 Brigitta Dau .... Lynn McKay
 Tamsin Kelsey .... D.A.
 Jerry Wasserman .... Detective
 Arlene Mazerolle .... Molly
 Byron Lucas .... Biker
 Robin Mossley .... Ticket agent
 BJ Harrison .... Judge
 Michelle T. Carter .... Travel agent
 Dee Jay Jackson .... Bus driver

External links
 
 

1990s thriller drama films
1994 television films
1994 films
American thriller drama films
Films about domestic violence
Films directed by Carl Schenkel
American thriller television films
Films scored by Christopher Franke
American drama television films
1990s American films